KBDB-FM is an American radio station licensed to operate on the FM frequency of 96.7 MHz.  Licensed to Forks, Washington,. the station is owned by Forks Broadcasting Inc. it broadcasts an adult contemporary format. KBDB-FM is the only commercial radio station serving the West End of Clallam County, Washington. The studios are at 260 Cedar Avenue in Forks.

The station's transmitter was located next to the studios until early 2016.  Because of its low-lying position in relation to the surrounding mountainous terrain—the antenna was 23 meters (75.5 feet) below average terrain—the 6,000 watt Class A signal barely reached beyond the valley.  In the spring of 2016, KBDB-FM began broadcasting a Class C3 signal from a mountaintop transmitter located approximately 5.5 km (3.4 miles) north-northwest of Sappho.

References

Marketwire - Nov 19, 2012

External links

BDB-FM
Mainstream adult contemporary radio stations in the United States
Radio stations established in 1994
1994 establishments in Washington (state)